Eley Williams  is a British writer. Her debut collection of prose, Attrib. and Other Stories (Influx Press, 2017), was awarded the Republic of Consciousness Prize and the James Tait Black Memorial Prize 2018. With writing anthologised in The Penguin Book of the Contemporary British Short Story (Penguin Classics, 2018), Liberating the Canon (Dostoevsky Wannabe, 2018) and Not Here: A Queer Anthology of Loneliness (Pilot Press, 2017), she is an alumna of the MacDowell workshop and a Fellow of the Royal Society of Literature. She teaches at Royal Holloway, University of London, and supervises Jungftak, a journal for contemporary prose poetry.

Her first novel, The Liar's Dictionary, was published in 2020, described in The Guardian as a "virtuoso performance full of charm... a glorious novel – a perfectly crafted investigation of our ability to define words and their power to define us". Stuart Kelly in a review in The Spectator wrote of the book: "It deals with love as something which cannot be put into words, and dare not speak its name (done neither stridently nor sentimentally). It is, in short, a delight."

Williams' stories "Moderate to Poor, Occasionally Good" (2018) and "Moonlighting" (2019) have been broadcast on BBC Radio 4 under the Short Works strand, and her story "Scrimshaw" was a finalist for the 2020 BBC National Short Story Award. A ten part radio series Gambits, based around the theme of chess, was broadcast on Radio 4 beginning in November 2021.

Awards 

 2021: Betty Trask Award 
 2018: The Republic of Consciousness Prize
 2017: James Tait Black Memorial Prize
 2005: Christopher Tower Poetry Prize

Selected bibliography 

 'In pursuit of the swan at Brentford Ait', essay in An Unreliable Guide to London, edited by Kit Caless and Gary Budden (2016)
Attrib. and Other Stories, short story collection (2017)
 Frit, poetry pamphlet (2017)
'Of Père Lachaise, On Business', in We'll Never Have Paris, edited by Andrew Gallix (2019)
'To Plot, Plan, Redress', on the Rebecca Riots 1839, in Resist: Stories of Uprising (2019)
'Scrimshaw', story anthologised in Still Worlds Turning (2019), shortlisted for the BBC National Short Story Award 2020
The Liar's Dictionary, novel (2020)

References 

Academics of the University of London
Alumni of Selwyn College, Cambridge
English writers
Fellows of the Royal Society of Literature
James Tait Black Memorial Prize recipients
Living people
Year of birth missing (living people)